Racovița (or Rakowitz) is a commune in Timiș County, Romania. It is composed of six villages: Căpăt, Drăgoiești, Ficătar, Hitiaș, Racovița (commune seat) and Sârbova.

Name

History 
The first recorded mention of Racovița dates from 1447. In the Middle Ages it was called Rakovicza and belonged to Temesdoboz estates. After the expulsion of the Turks from Banat, it was inhabited by Romanians and became the property of the Aerarium. In the chamber records from 1717 it appears mentioned with 40 houses, belonging to Nagykövéres estates.

Demographics 

Racovița had a population of 3,168 inhabitants at the 2011 census, down 4% from the 2002 census. Most inhabitants are Romanians (87.41%), larger minorities being represented by Roma (3.82%) and Ukrainians (3.31%). For 4.14% of the population, ethnicity is unknown. By religion, most inhabitants are Orthodox (88.95%), but there are also minorities of Pentecostals (3.19%), Greek Catholics (1.36%) and Roman Catholics (1.2%). For 4.14% of the population, religious affiliation is unknown.

Gallery

References 

Communes in Timiș County
Localities in Romanian Banat